The Courier from Lisbon is a 1921 German silent crime film directed by Ismar Stern.

The film's art direction was by Edmund Heuberger.

Cast
In alphabetical order

References

Bibliography

External links

1921 films
Films of the Weimar Republic
German silent feature films
German black-and-white films
1921 crime films
German crime films
1920s German films
1920s German-language films